I'm Different may refer to:

"I'm Different" (2 Chainz song), a song by American rapper 2 Chainz
"I'm Different" (Hi Suhyun song), a song by South Korean duo Hi Suhyun
The oracle turret from the game portal 2, a peaceful turret that says this line and expects you to save it from being incinerated